This is a list of women writers who were born in Sweden or  whose writings are closely associated with the country.

A
Sophie Adlersparre (1823–1895), journalist, editor, women's rights activist
Charlotte Agell (born 1959), English-language works for children and young adults 
Catharina Ahlgren (1734–1800)
Astrid Ahnfelt (1876–1962), writer, translator and editor, fostered cultural relations between Sweden and Italy
Sonja Åkesson (1926–1977), poet, dramatist
Susanna Alakoski (born 1962), Finnish-born author now in Sweden, novelist, author of Svinalängorna filmed as Beyond 
Eva Alexanderson (1911–1994), novelist, translator, publisher
 Elsa Alkman (1878–1975), suffragist, women's rights activist, writer and composer
Barbro Alving (1909–1987), journalist, feminist, screenwriter
Fanny Alving (1874–1955), journalist, novelist
Karin Alvtegen (born 1965), crime fiction writer, some works now in English
Lena Anderson (born 1939), children's writer and illustrator
Pamela Andersson (born 1965), journalist
Stina Aronson (1892–1956), novelist, her Hitom himlen features women in the farms of northern Sweden 
Suzanne Axell (born 1955), journalist, television presenter
Majgull Axelsson (born 1947), journalist, best-selling novelist

B
Victoria Benedictsson (1850–1888), realist novelist
Anne-Marie Berglund (1952–2020), poet, novelist, short story writer
Elisabeth Bergstrand-Poulsen (1887–1955), writer, artist, illustrator
Gunilla Bergström (1942–2021), journalist, widely translated children's author, creator of Alfie Atkins (Alfons Aberg)
Charlotta Berger (1784–1852)
Elsa Beskow (1874–1953), children's writer, novelist, illustrator
Eva Billow (1902–1993), writer and illustrator of children's literature
Margareta Birgersdotter Grip (1538–1586), genealogist, early documentalist 
Elsa Björkman-Goldschmidt (1888–1982), writer and lithographer
Ellen-Sylvia Blind (1925–2009), Swedish Sami writer 
Louise Boije af Gennäs (born 1961), novelist, feminist, co-creator of Swedish soap opera Rederiet
Sophie Bolander (1807–1869)
Hilma Borelius (1869–1932), literary historian, academic and suffragist
Karin Boye (1900–1941), novelist, poet, Swedes know her poems by heart
Eva Brag (1829–1913), novelist, poet, journalist
Agnes Branting (1862–1930), textile artist and writer
Fredrika Bremer (1801–1865), novelist, feminist writer
Irja Agnes Browallius (1901–1968), teacher, novelist, short story writer 
Annika Bryn (born 1945), journalist, short story writer, crime-fiction author
Maj Bylock (1931–2019), children's writer, translator, teacher

C
Gunnel Carlson (born 1956), gardening journalist, author, television presenter
Charlotte Cecilia af Tibell (1820-1901), author, hymn writer
Siv Cedering (1939–2007), children's writer, poet, writes in both English and Swedish
Sigrid Combüchen (born 1942), novelist, essayist, journalist, critic, author of Byron (1988)

D
Tora Dahl (1886–1982), novelist, teacher, gained fame with her autobiographic Fosterbarn (Foster Child) in 1954

E
Inger Edelfeldt (born 1956), novelist, short story writer, children's writer, illustrator
Brita Egardt (1916–1990), ethnologist and folklorist
Lena Einhorn (born 1954), director, writer and physician
Hedda Ekman (1860–1929), writer and photographer
Kerstin Ekman (born 1933), novelist, detective story writer, several English translations
Margareta Ekström (1930–2021), poet, novelist, children's writer,  critic
Elaine Eksvärd (born 1981), non-fiction writer specializing in rhetoric
Sigrid Elmblad (1860–1926), journalist, poet, translator and writer.
Helena Eriksson (born 1962), expressionist poet, author of Strata 
Maria Ernestam (born 1959), journalist, widely translated novelist

F
Phebe Fjellström (1924–2007), ethnologist
Emilie Flygare-Carlén (1807–1892), novelist
Maja Forsslund (1878–1967), folklorist and local historian
Tua Forsström (born 1947), highly acclaimed Swedish-language poet, widely translated, author of Efter att ha tillbringat en natt bland hästar (After Spending a Night among Horses) 
Marianne Fredriksson (1927–2007), journalist, novelist, most works translated into English
Inger Frimansson (born 1944), crime fiction writer, children's writer, journalist
Katarina Frostenson (born 1953), one of Sweden's foremost poets since the 1980s

G
Wilhelmina Gravallius (1809–1884)
Caroline Giertz (born 1958), writer and TV presenter
Elsa Grave (1918–2003), novelist, poet, artist
Maria Gripe (1923–2007), children's writer
Abela Gullbransson (1775–1822), revivalist writer
Madeleine Gustafsson (born 1937), poet, critic, translator

H
Anna Hamilton Geete (1848–1913), translator, biographer
Carola Hansson (born 1942), novelist, translator
Gunnel Hazelius-Berg (1905–1997), museum curator and writer, specializing in textiles and folk costumes
Barbro Hedvall (born 1944), journalist, non-fiction writer
Marie Hermanson (born 1956), thriller writer, author of The Devil's Sanctuary
Rut Hillarp (1914–2003), modernist poet evoking sexual relationships in a man's world
Karin Hübinette (born 1966), journalist, television presenter

I
Ulla Isaksson (1916–2000), novelist, short story writer, screenwriter, caused controversy among feminists with Paradistorg (Paradise Place, 1973)

J
Ann Jäderlund (born 1955), poet, playwright, children's writer
Ann Henning Jocelyn, (born 1948), writer, playwright and translator
Klara Johanson (1875–1948), literary critic, essayist, translator
Majken Johansson (1930–1993), now regarded as one of Sweden's greatest mid-20th century poets
Mari Jungstedt (born 1962), popular crime fiction writer, journalist, translated 15 languages including English

K

Mare Kandre (1962–2005), novelist, short story writer, several works translated into English
Kristina Kappelin (born 1958), journalist, columnist, non-fiction writer
Amanda Kerfstedt (1835–1920), novelist, playwright, translator
Ellen Key (1849–1926), feminist writer, advocate of child-centred education
Ellen Kleman (1867–1943), novelist, journal editor, women's rights activist
Linde Klinckowström-von Rosen (1920–2000), columnist, letter writer, non-fiction writer
Sophie von Knorring (1797–1848), pioneer of the realistic novel in Sweden
Thekla Knös (1815–1880)
Anja Kontor (born 1964), journalist, television presenter
Elisabeth Krey-Lange (1878–1965), journalist and women's rights activist
Agnes von Krusenstjerna (1894–1940), novelist, short story writer, often causing controversy with accounts of sexual intercourse
Annette Kullenberg (1939–2021), journalist, novelist, playwright

L
Camilla Läckberg (born 1974), best-seller crime writer, translated into 33 languages
Ann-Helén Laestadius (born 1971), Sami journalist and children's novelist, writing in Swedish
Selma Lagerlöf (1858–1940), children's writer, novelist, Nobel prize winner
Dagmar Lange (1914–1991), successful crime fiction writer under the pen name Maria Lang
Viveca Lärn (born 1944), journalist, children's writer
Åsa Larsson (born 1966), crime fiction writer
Lisbeth Larsson (1949–2021), literary historian focusing on gender studies
Zenia Larsson (1922–2007), writer and sculptor, one of the first Holocaust survivors in Sweden to describe their war experiences
Anne Charlotte Leffler (1849–1892), novelist, biographer
Anna Maria Lenngren (1754–1817), well-known poet, works in support of intellectual freedom of expression for women
Sara Lidman (1923–2004), novelist, several works translated into English
Birgitta Lillpers (born 1958), poet, novelist
Gunnel Linde (1924–2014), writer
Gurli Linder (1865–1947), writer, feminist, children's literature critic
Astrid Lindgren (1907–2002), world-famous children's writer, best known for her Pippi Longstocking stories
Barbro Lindgren (born 1937), children's writer
Anna Lindmarker (born 1961), journalist, broadcaster
Elin Lindqvist (born 1982), novelist
Eva Lindström (born 1952), illustrator and writer
Aurora Ljungstedt (1821–1908), crime horror writer
Kristina Lugn (1948–2020), poet, dramatist, critic

M

Bodil Malmsten (1944–2016), novelist, at least two works translated into English
Rosa Malmström (1906–1995), librarian and gender studies specialist
Edda Manga (born 1969), historian of ideas
Gerda Marcus (1880–1952), journalist, philanthropist
Liza Marklund (born 1962), best-seller crime fiction writer, works translated into 30 languages
Moa Martinson (1890–1964), ever popular novelist, writer of articles and books in support of women's rights
Ellen Mattson (born 1962), novelist, critic
Katarina Mazetti (born 1944), widely translated novelist, journalist
Margareta Momma (1702–1772)
Edita Morris (1902–1988), Swedish-American pacifist, short story writer, journalist, novelist
Alva Myrdal (1902–1986), welfare state proponent, author of Crisis in the Population Question

N
Anna T. Nilsson (1869–1869), educator, peace activist, writer
Kerstin Norborg (born 1961), novelist
Hedvig Charlotta Nordenflycht (1718–1763), revered poet, works defending women's rights, first self-supporting female writer in Sweden
Anna Nordgren (1847–1916), painter
Astrid Nyberg (1877–1928), pioneering newspaper editor and suffragist
Julia Nyberg (1784–1854), poet, songwriter, used the pen name Euphrosyne

O
Linda Olsson (born 1948), best-selling novelist, now in New Zealand
Rosalinde von Ossietzky-Palm (1919–2000), German-born Swedish non-fiction writer and pacifist
Nan Inger Östman (1923–2015), novelist, children's writer

P
Agneta Pleijel (born 1940), novelist, poet, playwright, journalist, critic, author of the philosophical novel Fungi

R
Karolina Ramqvist (born 1976), journalist 
Märta Helena Reenstierna (1753–1841), diarist
Christina Rogberg (1832–1907), author and courtier
Eva Runefelt (born 1953), novelist, poet
Carina Rydberg (born 1962), novelist, author of the controversial Den högsta kasten
Elisabeth Rynell (born 1954), poet, novelist, English translation of her novel Mervas

S
Hilda Sachs (1857–1935), journalist, novelist and women's rights activist
Marie Sophie Schwartz (1819–1894), novelist
Malla Silfverstolpe (1782–1861), diarist
Maj Sjöwall (1935–2020), novelist, some works written in collaboration with Per Wahlöö
Cecilia Skingsley (born 1968), journalist and economist
Edith Södergran (1892–1923), widely recognized Swedish-language modernist poet
Pernilla Stalfelt (born 1962), children's author and illustrator
Ingela Strandberg (born 1944), poet, children's writer, novelist, playwright, translator, journalist and musician
Sara Stridsberg (born 1972), novelist, poet
Eva Ström (born 1947), poet, novelist, biographer, critic
Amelie von Strussenfelt (1803–1847)
Ulrika von Strussenfelt (1801–1873)
Elsa Stuart-Bergstrom (1889-1970)
Margareta Suber (1892–1984), novelist, travel writer, children's writer, poet
Annakarin Svedberg (born 1934), novelist
Maria Sveland (born 1974), novelist and journalist

T

Gunhild Tegen (1889–1970), short story writer, editor, pacifist
Kerstin Thorvall (1925–2010), children's writer, novelist, journalist, illustrator
Johanna Thydell (born 1980), children's and youth writer
Anna-Clara Tidholm (born 1946), children's and youth writer, illustrator
Mia Törnblom (born 1967), columnist, non-fiction writer, educator
Rita Tornborg (born 1926), novelist, short story writer
Ulla Trenter (1936–2019), novelist, translator, politician
Birgitta Trotzig (1929–2011), celebrated writer of fiction, non-fiction and poetry
Helene Tursten (born 1954), crime fiction writer

U
Bea Uusma (born 1966), children's writer, non-fiction writer, illustrator, medical doctor

V
Gunnel Vallquist (1918–2016), essayist, non-fiction writer, translator, religious commentary

W
Elin Wägner (1882–1949), novelist, journalist, pacifist, feminist
Anna Westberg (1946–2005), novelist, non-fiction writer
Josefina Wettergrund (1830–1903)
Eva Wigström (1832–1901), writer, poet and pioneering folklorist
Liselott Willén (born 1972), novelist
Gunilla Wolde (1939–2015), children's writer, illustrator

See also
List of Swedish-language writers
List of women writers

References

Literature

-
Swedish
Writers
Writers, women